Kebabpizza Slivovitza is a song performed at Melodifestivalen 2008 by the group Andra Generationen. Being knocked out at the semifinals, the song lyrics depict traditions by immigrants in Sweden, especially those from the Balkan Peninsula, like kebab pizza and slivovitza, as well as prejudices.

On 22 July 2008, the song was performed at SVT's Allsång på Skansen.

Single
The single "Kebabpizza Slivovitza" was released on 20 February 2008, peaking at 2nd position at the Swedish singles chart.

On 2 March 2008 the song was tested for Svensktoppen but it failed to enter the chart.

Single track listing
Kebabpizza Slivovitza    
Aldrig Lycklig    
Kebabpizza Slivovitza (karaoke version)

Chart performance

References

Melodifestivalen songs of 2008
2008 singles
Swedish-language songs
2008 songs